James Willard McMillen (October 23, 1902 – January 27, 1984) was a professional American football player who played guard for five seasons for the Chicago Bears beginning in 1924. He was born in Grayslake, Illinois.  He attended the University of Illinois where he played football, wrestled, and was a member of Sigma Pi fraternity.  He was a Consensus All-American in 1923, All-Big Ten in 1922 and 1923, as well as team captain.  As a member of Illinois' wrestling team, he only lost one match in three years.

While playing for the Bears, McMillen continued to wrestle on the side.  He even left the Bears for a while because of how much money he was making as a wrestler.  In 1932 he was given the chance to buy stock in the Bears.  This purchase eventually allowed him to become one of the team's vice presidents.  During World War II, he was a Lt. Commander in the United States Navy and assigned to Navy Pier in Chicago.  In 1949 and 1953 he was elected mayor of Antioch, Illinois.

References

External links

1902 births
1984 deaths
American football guards
Chicago Bears players
Illinois Fighting Illini football players
All-American college football players
United States Navy personnel of World War II
United States Navy officers
American wrestlers